Nisker is a surname. Notable people with the surname include:

Merrill Nisker (born 1966), Canadian electronic musician better known as Peaches
Wes Nisker (born 1942), American  author, radio commentator, and comedian

Jewish surnames
Surnames of Polish origin